The Cloisters, formerly the Bell and Crown Inn, and now "The Bell and Crown" again from April 2019, is a grade II* listed public house in Catherine Street, Salisbury, Wiltshire, England. It dates from the fourteenth century.

References

External links

http://www.cloisterspubsalisbury.co.uk/

Grade II* listed pubs in Wiltshire
Buildings and structures in Salisbury
Buildings and structures completed in the 14th century